Henry Bridgeman, 1st Baron Bradford (7 September 1725 – 5 June 1800), known as Sir Henry Bridgeman, 5th Baronet, between 1764 and 1794, was a British politician who sat in the House of Commons for 46 years from 1748 to 1794 when he was raised to the peerage as Baron Bradford.

Background and education
Bridgeman was the second and eldest surviving son of Sir Orlando Bridgeman, 4th Baronet. His mother Anne was the daughter of Richard Newport, 2nd Earl of Bradford. He was educated at Queens' College, Cambridge, where he graduated with an MA in 1747. On the death of his maternal uncle, Thomas Newport, 4th Earl of Bradford, in 1762, Bridgeman inherited Weston Park and two years later he succeeded his father as baronet. Cambridge awarded him a Doctor of Laws in 1769 and the University of Oxford made him a Doctor of Civil Laws in 1793.

Career
In 1748, Bridgeman entered the British House of Commons, having been elected for Ludlow. He represented the constituency for twenty years until 1768 and sat then for (Much) Wenlock for another twentysix years. Bridgeman retired as Member of Parliament in 1794 and was elevated the Peerage of Great Britain with the title Baron Bradford, of Bradford, in the County of Shropshire on 13 August. He was nominated clerk of the household to George, Prince of Wales, a post he held until the latter's accession in 1760. A year later he was chosen clerk comptroller of the Board of Green Cloth, serving for the following three years. In 1774 Bridgeman became recorder for Much Wenlock, an appointment for life.

Family
Bridgeman married Elizabeth Simpson, daughter of Reverend John Simpson on 12 July 1755; they had eight children, five sons and three daughters. He died, aged 74, in Old Burlington Street in London in 1800 and his two oldest sons having predeceased him was succeeded in his titles by his third son Orlando, later raised to an earl. His fourth son John took over his seat in Parliament and assumed the surname Simpson. Bridgeman was survived by his widow until 1806; she died in Bath, Somerset, and was buried in Weston (Weston All Saints?).

Notes

References

1725 births
1800 deaths
Alumni of Queens' College, Cambridge
Barons Bradford
British MPs 1747–1754
British MPs 1754–1761
British MPs 1761–1768
British MPs 1768–1774
British MPs 1774–1780
British MPs 1780–1784
British MPs 1784–1790
British MPs 1790–1796
Members of the Parliament of Great Britain for English constituencies
Henry
Peers of Great Britain created by George III